The date of the first human presence in Ivory Coast (officially called Côte d'Ivoire) has been difficult to determine because human remains have not been well preserved in the country's humid climate. 

Weapon and tool fragments (specifically, polished axes cut through shale and remnants of cooking and fishing) have been interpreted as a possible indication of a large human presence during the Upper Paleolithic period (15,000 to 10,000 BC), or at the minimum, the Neolithic period. Historians believe that they were all either displaced or absorbed by the ancestors of the present inhabitants. Peoples who arrived before the 16th century include the Ehotilé (Aboisso), Kotrowou (Fresco), Zéhiri (Grand Lahou), Ega, and Diès (Divo).

Prehistory and early history
Little is known about the original inhabitants of Côte d'Ivoire. 

The first recorded history is found in the chronicles of North African Muslim traders, who, from early Roman times, conducted a caravan trade across the Sahara in salt, slaves, gold, and other items. The southern terminals of the trans-Saharan trade routes were located on the edge of the desert, and from there, supplemental trade extended as far south as the edge of the rainforest. The more important terminals—Djenné, Gao, and Timbuctu—grew into major commercial centers around which the great Sudanic empires developed. By controlling the trade routes with their powerful military forces, these empires were able to dominate neighboring states. The Sudanic empires also became centers of Islamic learning. Islam had been introduced into western Sudan by Arab traders from North Africa and spread rapidly after the conversion of many important rulers. From the eleventh century, by which time the rulers of the Sudan empires had embraced Islam, it spread south into the northern areas of contemporary Ivory Coast.

Ghana, the earliest of the Sudan empires, flourished in present-day eastern Mauritania from the fourth to the 13th century. At the peak of its power in the eleventh century, its realms extended from the Atlantic Ocean to Timbuctu. After the decline of Ghana Empire, the Mali Empire grew into a powerful Muslim state, which reached its apogee in the early part of the fourteenth century. The territory of the Mali Empire in Ivory Coast was limited to the northwest corner around Odienné. One of these, Songhai, flourished as an empire between the fourteenth and sixteenth centuries. Songhai was also weakened by internal discord, which led to factional warfare. This discord spurred most of the migrations of peoples southward toward the forest belt.

The dense rainforest covering the southern half of the country created barriers to large-scale political organization, as seen further north. Inhabitants lived in villages or clusters of villages whose contacts with the outside world were filtered through long-distance traders. Villagers subsisted on agriculture and hunting.

Five important states flourished in Ivory Coast in the pre-European era. The Muslim Kong Empire was established by the Juula in the early eighteenth century in the north-central region inhabited by the Sénoufo, who had fled Islamization under the Mali Empire. Although Kong became a prosperous center of agriculture, trade, and crafts, ethnic diversity and religious discord gradually weakened the kingdom. The city of Kong was destroyed in 1895 by Samori Touré.

The Bono kingdom of Gyaman was established in the 17th century by an Akan group, the Abron, who had fled the developing Ashanti Empire in what is present-day Ghana. From their settlement south of Bondoukou, the Abron gradually extended their hegemony over the Juula in Bondoukou, who were recent émigrés from the market city of Begho. Bondoukou developed into a major center of commerce and Islam. The kingdom's Quranic scholars attracted students from all parts of West Africa. In the mid-eighteenth century in east-central Ivory Coast, other Akan groups fleeing the Ashanti Empire established a Baoulé kingdom at Sakasso and two Agni kingdoms, Indénié and Sanwi. The Baoulé, like the Ashanti, elaborated a highly centralized political and administrative structure under three successive rulers, but it finally split into smaller chiefdoms. Despite the breakup of their kingdom, the Baoulé strongly resisted French subjugation. The descendants of the rulers of the Agni kingdoms tried to retain their separate identity long after Ivory Coast's independence; as late as 1969, the Sanwi of Krinjabo attempted to break away from Ivory Coast and form an independent kingdom.

Trade with Europe and the Americas
The African continent, situated between Europe and the imagined treasures of the Far East, quickly became a destination for the European explorers of the fifteenth century. The first Europeans to explore the West African coast were the Portuguese. Other European sea powers soon followed, and trade was established with many of the coastal peoples of West Africa. At first, the trade included gold, ivory, and pepper, but the establishment of American colonies in the sixteenth century spurred a demand for slaves, which led to the kidnap and enslavement of people from the West African coastal regions (see African slave trade). Local rulers, under treaties with the Europeans, procured goods and slaves from inhabitants of the interior. By the end of the fifteenth century, commercial contacts with Europe had spawned strong European influences, which permeated northward from the West African coast.

Ivory Coast, like the rest of West Africa, was subject to these influences, but the absence of sheltered harbors along its coastline prevented Europeans from establishing permanent trading posts. Seaborne trade, therefore, was irregular and played only a minor role in the penetration and eventual conquest by Europeans of Ivory Coast. The slave trade, in particular, had little effect on the peoples of Ivory Coast. A profitable trade in ivory, which gave the area its name, was carried out during the seventeenth century, but it brought about such a decline in elephants that the trade itself virtually had died out by the beginning of the eighteenth century.

The earliest recorded French voyage to West Africa took place in 1483. The first West African French settlement, Saint Louis, was founded in the mid-seventeenth century in Senegal, while at about the same time the Dutch ceded to the French a settlement at Ile de Gorée off Dakar. A French mission was established in 1687 at Assinie, near the Gold Coast (now Ghana) border, and it became the first European outpost in that area. Assini's survival was precarious, however, and only in the mid-nineteenth century did the French establish themselves firmly in Ivory Coast. By that time, they had already established settlements around the mouth of the Senegal River and at other points along the coasts of what are now Senegal, Gambia, and Guinea-Bissau. Meanwhile, the British had permanent outposts in the same areas and on the Gulf of Guinea east of Ivory Coast.

In the 18th century, the country was invaded by two related Akan groups – the Agni, who occupied the southeast, and the Baoulés, who settled in the central section. In 1843–1844, French admiral Bouët-Willaumez signed treaties with the kings of the Grand Bassam and Assini regions, placing their territories under a French protectorate. French explorers, missionaries, trading companies, and soldiers gradually extended the area under French control inland from the lagoon region. However, pacification was not accomplished until 1915.

Activity along the coast stimulated European interest in the interior, especially along the two great rivers, the Senegal and the Niger. Concerted French exploration of West Africa began in the mid-nineteenth century but moved slowly and was based more on individual initiative than on government policy. In the 1840s, the French concluded a series of treaties with local West African rulers that enabled the French to build fortified posts along the Gulf of Guinea to serve as permanent trading centers. The first posts in Ivory Coast included one at Assinie and another at Grand-Bassam, which became the colony's first capital. The treaties provided for French sovereignty within the posts and for trading privileges in exchange for fees or customs paid annually to the local rulers for the use of the land. The arrangement was not entirely satisfactory to the French because trade was limited and misunderstandings over treaty obligations often arose. Nevertheless, the French government maintained the treaties, hoping to expand trade. France also wanted to maintain a presence in the region to stem the increasing influence of the British along the Gulf of Guinea coast.

The defeat of France in the Franco-Prussian War (1871) and the subsequent annexation by Germany of the French province of Alsace-Lorraine caused the French government to abandon its colonial ambitions and withdraw its military garrisons from its French West African trading posts, leaving them in the care of resident merchants. The trading post at Grand-Bassam in Ivory Coast was left in the care of a shipper from Marseille, Arthur Verdier, who in 1878 was named resident of the Establishment of Ivory Coast.

In 1885 France and Germany brought all the European powers with interests in Africa together at the Berlin Conference. Its principal objective was to rationalize what became known as the European scramble for colonies in Africa. Prince Otto von Bismarck also wanted a greater role in Africa for Germany, which he thought he could achieve in part by fostering competition between France and Britain. The agreement signed by all participants in 1885 stipulated that on the African coastline only European annexations or spheres of influence that involved effective occupation by Europeans would be recognized. Another agreement in 1890 extended this rule to the interior of Africa and set off a scramble for territory, primarily by France, Britain, Portugal, and Belgium.

Establishment of French rule
In 1886, to support its claims of effective occupation, France again assumed direct control of its West African coastal trading posts and embarked on an accelerated program of exploration in the interior. In 1887 Lieutenant Louis Gustave Binger began a two-year journey across parts of Ivory Coast's interior. By the end of the journey, he had concluded four treaties establishing French protectorates in Ivory Coast. Also in 1887, Verdier's agent, Marcel Treich-Laplène, negotiated five additional agreements that extended French influence from the headwaters of the Niger River Basin through Ivory Coast.

By the end of the 1880s, France had established what passed for effective control over the coastal regions of Ivory Coast, and in 1889 Britain recognized French sovereignty in the area. That same year, France named Treich-Laplène titular governor of the territory. In 1893 Ivory Coast was made a French colony, and then Captain Binger was appointed governor. Agreements with Liberia in 1892 and with Britain in 1893 determined the eastern and western boundaries of the colony, but the northern boundary was not fixed until 1947 because of efforts by the French government to attach parts of Upper Volta (present-day Burkina Faso) and French Sudan (present-day Mali) to Ivory Coast for economic and administrative reasons.

Throughout the process of partition, the Africans were little concerned with the occasional white person who came wandering by. Many local rulers in small, isolated communities did not understand or, more often, were misled by the French about the significance of treaties that compromised their authority. Other local leaders, however, thought that the French could solve economic problems or become allies in the event of a dispute with belligerent neighbors. In the end, the loss of sovereignty by the local rulers was often the result of their inability to counter French deception and military force rather than a result of support for French encroachment.

French colonial era
Côte d'Ivoire officially became a French colony on 10 March 1893. Binger, who had explored the Gold Coast frontier, was named the first governor. He negotiated boundary treaties with Liberia and the United Kingdom (for the Gold Coast) and later started the campaign against Samori Ture, a Malinké chief, who fought against the French until 1898.

Throughout the early years of French rule, French military contingents were sent inland to establish new posts. The French penetration and settlement encountered much resistance from locals, even in areas where treaties of protection had been enforced. Among those offering greatest resistance was Samori Touré, who in the 1880s and 1890s was establishing an empire that extended over large parts of present-day Guinea, Mali, Burkina Faso, and Ivory Coast. Touré's large, well-equipped army, which could manufacture and repair its own firearms, attracted strong support throughout the region. The French responded to Samori Toure's expansion of regional control with military pressure. French campaigns against Touré, which were met with fierce resistance, intensified in the mid-1890s until he was captured in 1898.

France's imposition of a head tax in 1900, aimed at enabling the colony to undertake a public works program, provoked a number of revolts. The public works programs undertaken by the Ivorian colonial government and the exploitation of natural resources required massive commitments of labor. The French, therefore, imposed a system of forced labor under which each male adult Ivorian was required to work for ten days each year without compensation as part of his obligation to the state. The system was subject to extreme misuse and was the most hated aspect of French colonial rule. Because the population of Ivory Coast was insufficient to meet the labor demands of French-held plantations and forests, which were among the greatest users of labor in French West Africa, the French recruited large numbers of workers from Upper Volta to work in Ivory Coast. This source of labor was so important to the economic life of Ivory Coast that in 1932 the AOF annexed a large part of Upper Volta to Ivory Coast and administered it as a single colony. Many Ivorians viewed the tax as a violation of the terms of the protectorate treaties because it seemed that France was now demanding the equivalent of a coutume from the local kings rather than the reverse. Much of the population, especially in the interior, also considered the tax a humiliating symbol of submission.

From 1904 to 1958, Ivory Coast was a constituent unit of the Federation of French West Africa. It was a colony and an overseas territory under the Third Republic. Until the period following World War II, governmental affairs in French West Africa were administered from Paris. France's policy in West Africa was reflected mainly in its philosophy of "association", meaning that all Africans in Ivory Coast were officially French "subjects" without rights to representation in Africa or France. In 1905, the French officially abolished slavery in most of French West Africa.

In 1908 Gabriel Angoulvant was appointed governor of Ivory Coast. Angoulvant, who had little prior experience in Africa, believed that the development of Ivory Coast could proceed only after the forceful conquest, or so-called pacification, of the colony. He therefore sent military expeditions into the hinterland to quell resistance. As a result of these expeditions, local rulers were compelled to obey existing antislavery laws, supply porters and food to the French forces, and ensure the protection of French trade and personnel. In return, the French agreed to leave local customs intact and specifically promised not to intervene in the selection of rulers. But the French often disregarded their side of the agreement, deporting or interning rulers seen as instigators of revolt. They also regrouped villages and established a uniform administration throughout most of the colony. Finally, they replaced the coutume with an allowance based on performance.

French colonial policy incorporated concepts of assimilation and association. Assimilation presupposed the inherent superiority of French culture over all others, so that in practice the assimilation policy in the colonies meant extension of the French language, institutions, laws, and customs. The policy of association also affirmed the superiority of the French in the colonies, but it entailed different institutions and systems of laws for the colonizer and the colonized. Under this policy, the Africans in Ivory Coast were allowed to preserve their own customs insofar as they were compatible with French interests. An indigenous elite trained in French administrative practice formed an intermediary group between the French and the Africans.

Assimilation was practiced in Ivory Coast to the extent that after 1930 a small number of Westernised Ivorians were granted the right to apply for French citizenship. Most Ivorians, however, were classified as French subjects and were governed under the principle of association. As subjects of France they had no political rights. Moreover, they were drafted for work in mines, on plantations, as porters, and on public projects as part of their tax responsibility. They were also expected to serve in the military and were subject to the indigénat, a separate system of law.

In World War II, the Vichy regime remained in control until 1943, when members of General Charles De Gaulle's provisional government assumed control of all French West Africa. The Brazzaville conference in 1944, the first Constituent Assembly of the Fourth Republic in 1946, and France's gratitude for African loyalty during World War II led to far-reaching governmental reforms in 1946. French citizenship was granted to all African "subjects," the right to organise politically was recognised, and various forms of forced labour were abolished. A turning point in relations with France was reached with the 1956 Overseas Reform Act (Loi Cadre ), which transferred a number of powers from Paris to elected territorial governments in French West Africa and also removed remaining voting inequalities.

Until 1958, governors appointed in Paris administered the colony of Ivory Coast, using a system of direct, centralized administration that left little room for Ivorian participation in policy making. The French colonial administration also adopted divide-and-rule policies, applying ideas of assimilation only to the educated elite. The French were also interested in ensuring that the small but influential elite was sufficiently satisfied with the status quo to refrain from any anti-French sentiment. In fact, although they were strongly opposed to the practices of association, educated Ivorians believed that they would achieve equality with their French peers through assimilation rather than through complete independence from France, a change that would eliminate the enormous economic advantages of remaining a French possession. But after the assimilation doctrine was implemented entirely, at least in principle, through the postwar reforms, Ivorian leaders realised that even assimilation implied the superiority of the French over the Ivorians and that discrimination and inequality would end only with independence.

Independence

As early as 1944, Charles de Gaulle proposed to change France's politics and take "the road of a new era." In 1946, the French Empire was converted into the French Union which was itself superseded by the French Community in 1958.

In December of that year, Ivory Coast became an autonomous republic within the French Community as a result of a referendum on 7 August that brought community status to all members of the old Federation of French West Africa except Guinea, which had voted against association. On 11 July 1960 France agreed to Ivory Coast becoming fully independent. Ivory Coast became independent on 7 August 1960, and permitted its community membership to lapse. It established the commercial city Abidjan as its capital.

Ivory Coast's contemporary political history is closely associated with the career of Félix Houphouët-Boigny, President of the republic and leader of the Parti Démocratique de la Côte d'Ivoire (PDCI) until his death on December 7, 1993. He was one of the founders of the Rassemblement Démocratique Africain (RDA), the leading pre-independence inter-territorial political party for all of the French West African territories except Mauritania.

Houphouët-Boigny first came to political prominence in 1944 as founder of the Syndicat Agricole Africain, an organization that won improved conditions for African farmers and formed a nucleus for the PDCI. After World War II, he was elected by a narrow margin to the first Constituent Assembly. Representing Ivory Coast in the French National Assembly from 1946 to 1959, he devoted much of his effort to inter-territorial political organization and further amelioration of labor conditions. After his thirteen-year service in the French National Assembly, including almost three years as a minister in the French Government, he became Ivory Coast's first prime minister in April 1959, and the following year was elected its first president.

In May 1959, Houphouët-Boigny reinforced his position as a dominant figure in West Africa by leading Ivory Coast, Niger, Upper Volta (Burkina Faso), and Dahomey (Benin) into the Council of the Entente, a regional organization promoting economic development. He maintained that the road to African solidarity was through step-by-step economic and political cooperation, recognizing the principle of non-intervention in the internal affairs of other African states.

Houphouët-Boigny was considerably more conservative than most African leaders of the post-colonial period, maintaining close ties to the west and rejecting the leftist and anti-western stance of many leaders at the time. This contributed to the country's economic and political stability.

The first multiparty presidential elections were held in October 1990 and Houphouët-Boigny won convincingly.

After Houphouët-Boigny

Houphouët-Boigny died on 7 December 1993, and was succeeded by his deputy Henri Konan Bédié, President of the Parliament.

He was overthrown on 24 December 1999 by General Robert Guéï, a former army commander sacked by Bédié. This was the first coup d'état in the history of Ivory Coast. An economic downturn followed, and the junta promised to return the country to democratic rule in 2000.

Guéï allowed elections to be held the following year, but when these were won by Laurent Gbagbo he at first refused to accept his defeat. But street protests forced him to step down, and Gbagbo became president on 26 October 2000.

First Civil War

On 19 September 2002 a rebellion in the North and the West flared up and the country became divided in three parts. Mass murders occurred, notably in Abidjan from 25 to 27 March, when government forces killed more than 200 protesters, and on 20 and 21 June in Bouaké and Korhogo, where purges led to the execution of more than 100 people. A reconciliation process under international auspices started in 2003. In 2002 France sent its troops to Ivory Coast as peacekeepers. In February 2004 the United Nations established the United Nations Operation in Côte d'Ivoire (UNOCI)

A disarmament was supposed to take place on 15 October 2004, but was a failure. Ivory Coast is now divided between the rebel leader Guillaume Soro and president Laurent Gbagbo who has blocked the diplomatic advances made in Marcoussis and Accra—of the laws related to political reforms promised by Gbagbo in Accra, only two out of ten have been voted on so far. The rebel side has not kept its promises either, which results in a state of quasi–civil war.

Frustration is now a dominant sentiment in the population, especially since the overall quality of life has dropped since the Félix Houphouët-Boigny era. Responsibility for the worsening of the situation is widely attributed to the Northern people, though the quality of life under Houphouët-Boigny was mainly due to the sponsoring through the "Françafrique" system (designed to consolidate the influence of France in Africa), and the economy worked mainly thanks to a low-paid Burkinabé working class and immigrants from Mali.

The debt of the country has now risen, civil unrest is occurring daily, and political life has turned into personal struggles for interests. To answer these problems, the concept of "ivoirité" was born, a racist term which aims mainly at denying political and economic rights to the Northern immigrants.

New laws about eligibility, nationality and property are due to be adopted to address this issue, but if they are delayed, inscription of electors will be impossible before the next elections. This might lead to a dangerous situation where the government would stick to power, which the rebellion would likely not accept.

Tensions between Ivory Coast and France increased on 6 November 2004, after Ivorian air strikes killed 9 French peacekeepers and an aid worker. In response, French forces attacked the airport at Yamoussoukro, destroying all airplanes in the Ivorian Air Force. Violent protests erupted in both Abidjan and Yamoussoukro, and were marked by violence between Ivorians and French peacekeepers. Thousands of foreigners, especially French nationals, evacuated the two cities.

Most of the fighting ended by late 2004, with the country split between a rebel-held north and a government-held south. In March 2007 the two sides signed an agreement to hold fresh elections, though they ended up being delayed until 2010, five years after Gbagbo's term of office was supposed to have expired.

Second Civil War

After northern candidate Alassane Ouattara was declared the victor of the 2010 Ivorian presidential election by the country's Independent Electoral Commission (CEI), the President of the Constitutional Council – an ally of Gbagbo – declared the results to be invalid and that Gbagbo was the winner. Both Gbagbo and Ouattara claimed victory and took the presidential oath of office. The international community, including the United Nations, the African Union, the Economic Community of West African States (ECOWAS), the European Union, the United States, and former colonial power France affirmed their support for Ouattara and called for Gbagbo to step down. However, negotiations to resolve the dispute failed to achieve any satisfactory outcome. Hundreds of people were killed in escalating violence between pro-Gbagbo and pro-Ouattara partisans and at least a million people fled, mostly from Abidjan.

International organizations reported numerous instances of human rights violations by both sides, in particular in the city of Duékoué. The UN and French forces took military action, with the stated objective to protect their forces and civilians. Ouattara's forces arrested Gbagbo at his residence on 11 April 2011.

After the 2011 Civil War 

Alassane Ouattara has ruled the country since 2010 when he unseated his predecessor Laurent Gbagbo. President Ouattara was re-elected in 2015 presidential election. In November 2020, he won third term in office in elections that were boycotted by the opposition. His opponents argued it was illegal for President Ouattara to run for a third term. Ivory Coast's Constitutional Council formally ratified President Alassane Ouattara's re-election to a third term in November 2020.

See also
History of Africa
History of West Africa
List of heads of government of Ivory Coast
List of heads of state of Ivory Coast
Politics of Ivory Coast
 Abidjan history and timeline

References

Works cited

Further reading

 Chafer, Tony. The End of Empire in French West Africa: France's Successful Decolonization. Berg (2002). 

 
Ivory Coast (colonial)